The DVD (common abbreviation for Digital Video Disc or Digital Versatile Disc) is a digital optical disc data storage format. It was invented and developed in 1995 and first released on November 1, 1996, in Japan. The medium can store any kind of digital data and has been widely used for video programs (watched using DVD players) or formerly for storing software and other computer files as well. DVDs offer significantly higher storage capacity than compact discs (CD) while having the same dimensions. A standard DVD can store up to 4.7 GB of storage, while variants can store up to a maximum of 17.08 GB.

Prerecorded DVDs are mass-produced using molding machines that physically stamp data onto the DVD. Such discs are a form of DVD-ROM because data can only be read and not written or erased. Blank recordable DVD discs (DVD-R and DVD+R) can be recorded once using a DVD recorder and then function as a DVD-ROM. Rewritable DVDs (DVD-RW, DVD+RW, and DVD-RAM) can be recorded and erased many times.

DVDs are used in DVD-Video consumer digital video format and less commonly in DVD-Audio consumer digital audio format, as well as for authoring DVD discs written in a special AVCHD format to hold high definition material (often in conjunction with AVCHD format camcorders). DVDs containing other types of information may be referred to as DVD data discs.

Etymology 
The Oxford English Dictionary comments that, "In 1995, rival manufacturers of the product initially named digital video disc agreed that, in order to emphasize the flexibility of the format for multimedia applications, the preferred abbreviation DVD would be understood to denote digital versatile disc." The OED also states that in 1995, "The companies said the official name of the format will simply be DVD. Toshiba had been using the name 'digital video disc', but that was switched to 'digital versatile disc' after computer companies complained that it left out their applications."

"Digital versatile disc" is the explanation provided in a DVD Forum Primer from 2000 and in the DVD Forum's mission statement, which the purpose is to promote broad acceptance of DVD products on technology, across entertainment, and other industries.

Because DVDs became highly popular for the distribution of movies in the 2000s, the term DVD became popularly used in English as a noun to describe specifically a full-length movie released on the format; for example the sentence to "watch a DVD" describes watching a movie on DVD.

History

Development and launch 

Released in 1987, CD Video used analog video encoding on optical discs matching the established standard  size of audio CDs. Video CD (VCD) became one of the first formats for distributing digitally encoded films in this format, in 1993. In the same year, two new optical disc storage formats were being developed. One was the Multimedia Compact Disc (MMCD), backed by Philips and Sony (developers of the CD and CD-i), and the other was the Super Density (SD) disc, supported by Toshiba, Time Warner, Matsushita Electric, Hitachi, Mitsubishi Electric, Pioneer, Thomson, and JVC. By the time of the press launches for both formats in January 1995, the MMCD nomenclature had been dropped, and Philips and Sony were referring to their format as Digital Video Disc (DVD).

On May 3, 1995, an ad hoc, technical working group formed from five computer companies (IBM, Apple, Compaq, Hewlett-Packard, and Microsoft) issued a press release stating that they would only accept a single format. The TWG voted to boycott both formats unless the two camps agreed on a single, converged standard. They recruited Lou Gerstner, president of IBM, to pressure the executives of the warring factions. In one significant compromise, the MMCD and SD groups agreed to adopt proposal SD 9, which specified that both layers of the dual-layered disc be read from the same side—instead of proposal SD 10, which would have created a two-sided disc that users would have to turn over. As a result, the DVD specification provided a storage capacity of 4.7 GB (4.38 GiB) for a single-layered, single-sided disc and 8.5 GB (7.92 GiB) for a dual-layered, single-sided disc. The DVD specification ended up similar to Toshiba and Matsushita's Super Density Disc, except for the dual-layer option. MMCD was single-sided and optionally dual-layer, whereas SD was two half-thickness, single-layer discs which were pressed separately and then glued together to form a double-sided disc.

Philips and Sony decided that it was in their best interests to end the format war, and on September 15, 1995 agreed to unify with companies backing the Super Density Disc to release a single format, with technologies from both. After other compromises between MMCD and SD, the computer companies through TWG won the day, and a single format was agreed upon. The TWG also collaborated with the Optical Storage Technology Association (OSTA) on the use of their implementation of the ISO-13346 file system (known as Universal Disk Format) for use on the new DVDs. The format's details were finalized on December 8, 1995.

In November 1995, Samsung announced it would start mass-producing DVDs by September 1996. The format launched on November 1, 1996, in Japan, mostly with music video releases. The first major releases from Warner Home Video arrived on December 20, 1996, with four titles being available. The format's release in the U.S. was delayed multiple times, from August 1996, to October 1996, November 1996, before finally settling on early 1997. Players began to be produced domestically that winter, with March 24, 1997 as the U.S. launch date of the format proper in seven test markets. Approximately 32 titles were available on launch day, mainly from the Warner, MGM, and New Line libraries. However, the launch was planned for the following day (March 25), leading to a distribution change with retailers and studios to prevent similar violations of breaking the street date. The nationwide rollout for the format happened on August 22, 1997.

DTS announced in late 1997 that they would be coming onto the format. The sound system company revealed details in a November 1997 online interview, and clarified it would release discs in early 1998. However, this date would be pushed back several times before finally releasing their first titles at the 1999 Consumer Electronics Show.

In 2001, blank DVD recordable discs cost the equivalent of $27.34 US dollars in 2022.

Adoption

Movie and home entertainment distributors adopted the DVD format to replace the ubiquitous VHS tape as the primary consumer video distribution format.

Immediately following the formal adoption of a unified standard for DVD, two of the four leading video game console companies (Sega and The 3DO Company) said they already had plans to design a gaming console with DVDs as the source medium. Sony stated at the time that they had no plans to use DVD in their gaming systems, despite being one of the developers of the DVD format and eventually the first company to actually release a DVD-based console. Game consoles such as the PlayStation 2, Xbox, and Xbox 360 use DVDs as their source medium for games and other software. Contemporary games for Windows were also distributed on DVD. Early DVDs were mastered using DLT tape, but using DVD-R DL or +R DL eventually became common. TV DVD combos, combining a standard definition CRT TV or an HD flat panel TV with a DVD mechanism under the CRT or on the back of the flat panel, and VCR/DVD combos were also available for purchase.

For consumers, DVD soon replaced VHS as the favored choice for home movie releases. In the year 2001, DVD players outsold VCRs for the first time in the United States. At this time 1 in 4 American households owned a DVD player. By 2007, about 80% of Americans owned a DVD player, a figure that had surpassed VCRs and was also higher than personal computers or cable television.

Specifications
The DVD specifications created and updated by the DVD Forum are published as so-called DVD Books (e.g. DVD-ROM Book, DVD-Audio Book, DVD-Video Book, DVD-R Book, DVD-RW Book, DVD-RAM Book, DVD-AR (Audio Recording) Book, DVD-VR (Video Recording) Book, etc.). DVD discs are made up of two discs; normally one is blank, and the other contains data. Each disc is 0.6 mm thick, and are glued together to form a DVD disc. The gluing process must be done carefully to make the disc as flat as possible to avoid both birefringence and "disc tilt", which is when the disc is not perfectly flat, preventing it from being read.

Some specifications for mechanical, physical and optical characteristics of DVD optical discs can be downloaded as freely available standards from the ISO website. There are also equivalent European Computer Manufacturers Association (Ecma) standards for some of these specifications, such as Ecma-267 for DVD-ROMs. Also, the DVD+RW Alliance publishes competing recordable DVD specifications such as DVD+R, DVD+R DL, DVD+RW or DVD+RW DL. These DVD formats are also ISO standards.

Some DVD specifications (e.g. for DVD-Video) are not publicly available and can be obtained only from the DVD Format/Logo Licensing Corporation (DVD FLLC) for a fee of US$5000. Every subscriber must sign a non-disclosure agreement as certain information on the DVD Books is proprietary and confidential.

Double-sided discs 

Borrowing from the LaserDisc format, the DVD standard includes DVD-10 discs (Type B in ISO) with two recorded data layers such that only one layer is accessible from either side of the disc. This doubles the total nominal capacity of a DVD-10 disc to 9.4 GB (8.75 GiB), but each side is locked to 4.7 GB. Like DVD-5 discs, DVD-10 discs are defined as single-layer (SL) discs.

Dual-layer discs 
DVD hardware accesses the additional layer (layer 1) by refocusing the laser through an otherwise normally-placed, semitransparent first layer (layer 0). This laser refocus—and the subsequent time needed to reacquire laser tracking—can cause a noticeable pause in A/V playback on earlier DVD players, the length of which varies between hardware. A printed message explaining that the layer-transition pause was not a malfunction became standard on DVD keep cases. During mastering, a studio could make the transition less obvious by timing it to occur just before a camera angle change or other abrupt shift, an early example being the DVD release of Toy Story. Later in the format's life, larger data buffers and faster optical pickups in DVD players made layer transitions effectively invisible regardless of mastering.

Dual-layer DVDs are recorded using Opposite Track Path (OTP).

Combinations of the above 
The DVD Book also permits an additional disc type called DVD-14: a hybrid double-sided disc with one dual-layer side, one single-layer side, and a total nominal capacity of 12.3 GB. DVD-14 has no counterpart in ISO.

Both of these additional disc types are extremely rare due to their complicated and expensive manufacturing. For this reason, some DVDs that were initially issued as double-sided discs were later pressed as two-disc sets.

 The above sections regarding disc types pertain to 12 cm discs. The same disc types exist for 8 cm discs: ISO standards still regard these discs as Types A–D, while the DVD Book assigns them distinct disc types. DVD-14 has no analogous 8 cm type. The comparative data for 8 cm discs is provided further down.

DVD recordable and rewritable

HP initially developed recordable DVD media from the need to store data for backup and transport.  DVD recordables are now also used for consumer audio and video recording. Three formats were developed: DVD-R/RW, DVD+R/RW (plus), and DVD-RAM. DVD-R is available in two formats, General (650 nm) and Authoring (635 nm), where Authoring discs may be recorded with CSS encrypted video content but General discs may not.

Dual-layer recording 
Dual-layer recording (occasionally called double-layer recording) allows DVD-R and DVD+R discs to store nearly double the data of a single-layer disc—8.5 and 4.7 gigabyte capacities, respectively. The additional capacity comes at a cost: DVD±DLs have slower write speeds as compared to DVD±R. DVD-R DL was developed for the DVD Forum by Pioneer Corporation; DVD+R DL was developed for the DVD+RW Alliance by Mitsubishi Kagaku Media (MKM) and Philips.

Recordable DVD discs supporting dual-layer technology are backward-compatible with some hardware developed before the recordable medium.

Capacity

All units are expressed with SI/IEC prefixes (i.e., 1 Gigabyte = 1,000,000,000 bytes).

All units are expressed with SI/IEC prefixes (i.e., 1 Gigabyte = 1,000,000,000 bytes).

All units are expressed with SI/IEC prefixes (i.e., 1 Gigabyte = 1,000,000,000 bytes).

DVD drives and players 

DVD drives are devices that can read DVD discs on a computer. DVD players are a particular type of devices that do not require a computer to work, and can read DVD-Video and DVD-Audio discs.

Transfer rates

Read and write speeds for the first DVD drives and players were 1,385 kB/s (1,353 KiB/s); this speed is usually called "1×". More recent models, at 18× or 20×, have 18 or 20 times that speed. Note that for CD drives, 1× means 153.6 kB/s (150 KiB/s), about one-ninth as swift.

DVDs can spin at much higher speeds than CDs – DVDs can spin at up to 32000 RPM vs 23000 for CDs.

DVD recordable and rewritable discs can be read and written using either constant angular velocity (CAV), constant linear velocity (CLV), Partial constant angular velocity (P-CAV) or Zoned Constant Linear Velocity (Z-CLV or ZCLV).

Due to the slightly lower data density of dual layer DVDs (4.25 GB instead of 4.7 GB per layer), the required rotation speed is around 10% faster for the same data rate, which means that the same angular speed rating equals a 10% higher physical angular rotation speed. For that reason, the increase of reading speeds of dual layer media has stagnated at 12× (constant angular velocity) for half-height optical drives released since around 2005, and slim type optical drives are only able to record dual layer media at 6× (constant angular velocity), while reading speeds of 8× are still supported by such.

Disc quality measurements 

The quality and data integrity of optical media is measureable, which means that future data losses caused by deteriorating media can be predicted well in advance by measuring the rate of correctable data errors.

Support of measuring the disc quality varies among optical drive vendors and models.

DVD-Video 

DVD-Video is a standard for distributing video/audio content on DVD media. The format went on sale in Japan on November 1, 1996, in the United States on March 24, 1997, to line up with the 69th Academy Awards that day; in Canada, Central America, and Indonesia later in 1997, and in Europe, Asia, Australia, and Africa in 1998. DVD-Video became the dominant form of home video distribution in Japan when it first went on sale on November 1, 1996, but it shared the market for home video distribution in the United States for several years; it was June 15, 2003, when weekly DVD-Video in the United States rentals began outnumbering weekly VHS cassette rentals.
DVD-Video is still the dominant form of home video distribution worldwide except for in Japan where it was surpassed by Blu-ray Disc when Blu-ray first went on sale in Japan on March 31, 2006.

Security

The purpose of CSS is twofold:
 CSS prevents byte-for-byte copies of an MPEG (digital video) stream from being playable since such copies do not include the keys that are hidden on the lead-in area of the restricted DVD.
 CSS provides a reason for manufacturers to make their devices compliant with an industry-controlled standard, since CSS scrambled discs cannot in principle be played on noncompliant devices; anyone wishing to build compliant devices must obtain a license, which contains the requirement that the rest of the DRM system (region codes, Macrovision, and user operation prohibition) be implemented.

Successors and decline

In 2006, two new formats called HD DVD and Blu-ray Disc were released as the successor to DVD. HD DVD competed unsuccessfully with Blu-ray Disc in the format war of 2006–2008. A dual layer HD DVD can store up to 30 GB and a dual layer Blu-ray disc can hold up to 50 GB.

However, unlike previous format changes, e.g., vinyl to Compact Disc or VHS videotape to DVD, initially there was no immediate indication that production of the standard DVD will gradually wind down, as at the beginning of the 2010 decade they still dominated, with around 75% of video sales and approximately one billion DVD player sales worldwide as of April 2011. In fact, experts claimed that the DVD will remain the dominant medium for at least another five years as Blu-ray technology was still in its introductory phase, write and read speeds being poor and necessary hardware being expensive and not readily available.

Consumers initially were also slow to adopt Blu-ray due to the cost. By 2009, 85% of stores were selling Blu-ray Discs. A high-definition television and appropriate connection cables are also required to take advantage of Blu-ray disc. Some analysts suggested that the biggest obstacle to replacing DVD was due to its installed base; a large majority of consumers were satisfied with DVDs.

DVDs started to face competition from video on demand services around 2015. With increasing numbers of homes having high speed Internet connections, many people had the option to either rent or buy video from an online service, and view it by streaming it directly from that service's servers, meaning they no longer need any form of permanent storage media for video at all. By 2017, digital streaming services had overtaken the sales of DVDs and Blu-rays for the first time.

Until the end of the 2010 decade, manufacturers continued to release standard DVD titles , and the format remained the preferred one for the release of older television programs and films. Shows that were shot and edited entirely on film, such as Star Trek: The Original Series, could not be released in high definition without being re-scanned from the original film recordings. Shows that were made between the early 1980s and the early 2000s were generally shot on film, then transferred to video tape, and then edited natively in either NTSC or PAL, making high-definition transfers impossible as these SD standards were baked into the final cuts of the episodes. Star Trek: The Next Generation was the only such show that had a Blu-ray release, as prints were re-scanned and edited from the ground up.

By the beginning of the 2020s, sales of DVD had dropped 86% with respect to the peak of DVD sales around 2005, while on-demand sales and, overall, subscription streaming of TV shows and movies grew by over 1200%. At its peak DVD sales represented almost two thirds of video market in the US but only 15 years later, around 2020, they fell to only 10% of the market.

By 2022 there was an increased demand of high definition media and almost half of the DVD market was in ultra high definition Blue Ray DVDs (UHD) and regular Blue Ray formats while sales of physical media continued to shrink in favor of streaming services.

Longevity
Longevity of a storage medium is measured by how long the data remains readable, assuming compatible devices exist that can read it: that is, how long the disc can be stored until data is lost. Numerous factors affect longevity: composition and quality of the media (recording and substrate layers), humidity and light storage conditions, the quality of the initial recording (which is sometimes a matter of mutual compatibility of media and recorder), etc. According to NIST, "[a] temperature of 64.4 °F (18 °C) and 40% RH [Relative Humidity] would be considered suitable for long-term storage. A lower temperature and RH is recommended for extended-term storage."

As with CDs, the information and data storage will begin to degrade over time with most standard DVDs lasting up to 30 years depending the type of environment they are stored and whether they are full with data.

According to the Optical Storage Technology Association (OSTA), "Manufacturers claim lifespans ranging from 30 to 100 years for DVD, DVD-R and DVD+R discs and up to 30 years for DVD-RW, DVD+RW and DVD-RAM."

According to a NIST/LoC research project conducted in 2005–2007 using accelerated life testing, "There were fifteen DVD products tested, including five DVD-R, five DVD+R, two DVD-RW and three DVD+RW types. There were ninety samples tested for each product. ... Overall, seven of the products tested had estimated life expectancies in ambient conditions of more than 45 years. Four products had estimated life expectancies of 30–45 years in ambient storage conditions. Two products had an estimated life expectancy of 15–30 years and two products had estimated life expectancies of less than 15 years when stored in ambient conditions." The life expectancies for 95% survival estimated in this project by type of product are tabulated below:

See also 

List of computer hardware
Book type
Comparison of popular optical data-storage systems
Digital video recorder
Disk-drive performance characteristics
DVD authoring
DVD ripper
DVD region code
DVD TV game – Interactive movie
Professional disc
DVD single
M-DISC

Notes

References

Further reading

External links

Dvddemystified.com:  DVD Frequently Asked Questions and Answers
Dual Layer Explained – Informational Guide to the Dual Layer Recording Process

 
120 mm discs
Audiovisual introductions in 1996
Products introduced in 1996
Audio storage
Consumer electronics
Digital audio storage
Home video
.
Dutch inventions
Information technology in Japan
Information technology in the Netherlands
Japanese inventions
Joint ventures
Rotating disc computer storage media
Science and technology in Japan
Science and technology in the Netherlands
.
Video storage
Digital media